Rote can refer to:

People
Jason Butler Rote, American TV writer
Kyle Rote (1928–2002), American football player and father of:
Kyle Rote, Jr. (born 1950), American soccer player
Ryan Rote (born 1982), baseball pitcher
Tobin Rote (1928–2000), American quarterback in the National, American and Canadian Football Leagues

Other uses
Rote learning
Rote Island, an island in Indonesia
Crwth, a Welsh instrument
Return on tangible equity, an economic concept